Martin Förster (born 14 April 1966) is a Czech luger. He competed in the men's singles and the doubles events at the 1984 Winter Olympics.

References

External links
 

1966 births
Living people
Czech male lugers
Olympic lugers of Czechoslovakia
Lugers at the 1984 Winter Olympics
Sportspeople from Jablonec nad Nisou